The 2002–2003 season was Liverpool Football Club's 111th season in existence and their 41st consecutive season in the top-flight of English football.

Season summary
Having finished second the previous season, Liverpool had high hopes to win their first league title since 1990. Indeed, they topped the Premier League table after their first 12 games (including a seven-game winning streak), picking up 30 points out of a possible 36, a run which saw them four points clear at the top from reigning champions Arsenal. However, on 9 November 2002, they suffered a surprise 1–0 away defeat at the hands of high-fliers Middlesbrough. This wasn't completely disastrous; it did see their lead cut to one point but three days later, they completed a miserable week after they bowed out of the Champions League after failure to beat Basel. That week's two results started a freefall of 13 matches without victory (including 11 league games) and a dismal run of only two wins in 16 league matches (both away at Southampton and West Ham United) which ended such title hopes. They were, in fact, out of the top 4 altogether never to return after a shock 2–1 defeat at struggling Sunderland. However, their first home league win in four months came in a 2–0 win over Bolton Wanderers on 8 March 2003, starting a more promising run of seven wins in eight league games which almost took the club to Champions League qualification anyway, but defeats at the hands of Manchester City and Chelsea in the final two games of the season buried those hopes. A League Cup win following a 2–0 victory over arch-rivals Manchester United was the sole glorious moment of a disappointing season.

Final league table

First-team squad

Left club during season

Statistics

Appearances
As of end of season

Transfers

In

Out

 In:  £18,400,000
 Out:  £5,250,000
 Total spending:  £13,150,000

Results

Premier League

Results by round

Champions League

Group B

UEFA Cup

FA Cup

League Cup

References

Notes

External links
2002–03 Liverpool F.C. season at LFCHistory.net

2002-2003
Liverpool